Flora Hofman (born 17 November 1911, date of death unknown) was a Yugoslav sprinter. She competed in the women's 100 metres at the 1936 Summer Olympics.

References

External links
 

1911 births
Year of death missing
Athletes (track and field) at the 1936 Summer Olympics
Yugoslav female sprinters
Bosnia and Herzegovina female sprinters
Olympic athletes of Yugoslavia
People from the Condominium of Bosnia and Herzegovina
Sportspeople from Sarajevo
Olympic female sprinters